Heishan is a county of north-central Liaoning, People's Republic of China. It is under the administration and occupies the northeastern corner of Jinzhou City.

Administrative divisions
There are 17 towns, six townships, and two ethnic townships in the county.

Towns:
Xinlitun, Heishan, Badaohao, Xiaodong, Dahushan, Wuliangdian, Baichangmen, Banlamen, Sijiazi, Fangshan, Lijia, Hujia, Jiangtun, Raoyanghe, Changxing, Xinxing

Townships:
Daxing Township, LIuhe Township, Taihe Township, Yingchengzi Township, Duanjia Township, Xuetun Township, Situn Manchu Ethnic Township, Zhen'an Manchu Ethnic Township

Climate
Heishan has a monsoon-influenced humid continental climate (Köppen Dwa), characterised by hot, humid summers and long, cold and windy, but dry winters. The four seasons here are distinctive. A majority of the annual rainfall of  occurs in July and August alone. The frost-free period lasts an average 160 days.

References

External links

 
County-level divisions of Liaoning
Jinzhou